In chemistry, a half reaction (or half-cell reaction) is either the oxidation or reduction reaction component of a redox reaction. A half reaction is obtained by considering the change in oxidation states of individual substances involved in the redox reaction.
Often, the concept of half reactions is used to describe what occurs in an electrochemical cell, such as a Galvanic cell battery. Half reactions can be written to describe both the metal undergoing oxidation (known as the anode) and the metal undergoing reduction (known as the cathode).

Half reactions are often used as a method of balancing redox reactions. For oxidation-reduction reactions in acidic conditions, after balancing the atoms and oxidation numbers, one will need to add  ions to balance the hydrogen ions in the half reaction. For oxidation-reduction reactions in basic conditions, after balancing the atoms and oxidation numbers, first treat it as an acidic solution and then add  ions to balance the  ions in the half reactions (which would give ).

Example: Zn and Cu Galvanic cell

Consider the Galvanic cell shown in the adjacent image: it is constructed with a piece of zinc (Zn) submerged in a solution of zinc sulfate and a piece of copper (Cu) submerged in a solution of copper(II) sulfate. The overall reaction is:

Zn_{(s)}{} + CuSO4_{(aq)} -> ZnSO4_{(aq)}{} + Cu_{(s)}

At the Zn anode, oxidation takes place (the metal loses electrons). This is represented in the following oxidation half reaction (note that the electrons are on the products side):

Zn_{(s)} -> Zn^2+ + 2e-

At the Cu cathode, reduction takes place (electrons are accepted). This is represented in the following reduction half reaction (note that the electrons are on the reactants side):

Cu^2+ + 2e- -> Cu_{(s)}

Example: oxidation of magnesium

Consider the example burning of magnesium ribbon (Mg). When magnesium burns, it combines with oxygen from the air to form magnesium oxide (MgO) according to the following equation:

2Mg_{(s)}{} + O2_{(g)} -> 2MgO_{(s)}

This is because when  becomes , it loses 2 electrons. Since there are 2 Mg on left side, a total of 4 electrons are lost according to the following oxidation half reaction:

2Mg_{(s)} -> 2Mg^2+ + 4e-

On the other hand, O2 was reduced: its oxidation state goes from 0 to -2. Thus, a reduction half reaction can be written for the O2 as it gains 4 electrons:

O2_{(g)}{} + 4e- -> 2O^2-

The overall reaction is the sum of both half reactions:

2Mg_{(s)}{} + O2_{(g)}{} + 4e- -> 2Mg^2+ + 2O^2- + 4e-

When chemical reaction, especially, redox reaction takes place, we do not see the electrons as they appear and disappear during the course of the reaction. What we see is the reactants (starting material) and end products. Due to this, electrons appearing on both sides of the equation are canceled. After canceling, the equation is re-written as

2Mg_{(s)}{} + O2_{(g)} -> 2Mg^2+ + 2O^2-

Two ions, positive and negative exist on product side and they combine immediately to form a compound magnesium oxide (MgO) due to their opposite charges (electrostatic attraction). In any given oxidation-reduction reaction, there are two half reactions—oxidation half reaction and reduction half reaction. The sum of these two half reactions is the oxidation–reduction reaction.

Half-reaction balancing method
Consider the reaction below:

Cl2 + 2Fe^2+ -> 2Cl- + 2Fe^3+

The two elements involved, iron and chlorine, each change oxidation state; iron from +2 to +3, chlorine from 0 to −1. There are then effectively two half reactions occurring. These changes can be represented in formulas by inserting appropriate electrons into each half reaction:

Given two half reactions it is possible, with knowledge of appropriate electrode potentials, to arrive at the complete (original) reaction the same way. The decomposition of a reaction into half reactions is key to understanding a variety of chemical processes. For example, in the above reaction, it can be shown that this is a redox reaction in which Fe is oxidised, and Cl is reduced. Note the transfer of electrons from Fe to Cl. Decomposition is also a way to simplify the balancing of a chemical equation. A chemist can atom balance and charge balance one piece of an equation at a time.

For example:
  becomes 
 is added to 
 and finally becomes 

It is also possible and sometimes necessary to consider a half reaction in either basic or acidic conditions, as there may be an acidic or basic electrolyte in the redox reaction. Due to this electrolyte it may be more difficult to satisfy the balance of both the atoms and charges.

Consider the half reaction below:

 PbO2 -> PbO

, and  can be used to balance the charges and atoms in basic conditions, as long as it is assumed that the reaction is in water.

 2e- + H2O + PbO2 -> PbO + 2OH-

Again consider the half reaction below:

 PbO2 -> PbO

, and  can be used to balance the charges and atoms in acidic conditions, as long as it is assumed that the reaction is in water.

 2e- + 2H+ + PbO2 -> PbO + H2O

Notice that both sides are both charge balanced and atom balanced.

Often there will be both  and  present in acidic and basic conditions but that the resulting reaction of the two ions will yield water,  (shown below):

 H+ + OH- -> H2O

See also 
Electrode potential
Standard electrode potential (data page)

References

Electrochemistry